The Tombs of Malta are a series of prehistoric tombs in the Maltese archipelago.

Tombs
Bingemma Tombs
Għar il-Midfna
Kerċem Tombs
Għar ta' Għejzu
Ta' Ċenċ Gallery Grave
Wied tax-Xlendi Tomb
Xagħra Stone Circle
Xemxija Tombs

See also
Megalithic Temples of Malta
Ħal-Saflieni Hypogeum
Għar Dalam

References

Archaeological sites in Malta
Megalithic monuments in Europe